Chickillo is a surname. Notable people with the surname include:

Anthony Chickillo (born 1992), American football player, son of Tony and grandson of Nick
Nick Chickillo (1930–2000), American football player
Tony Chickillo (born 1960), American football player